The 2016 Belk Bowl was a postseason college football bowl game played on December 29, 2016. The game featured the Arkansas Razorbacks of the Southeastern Conference and the Virginia Tech Hokies of the Atlantic Coast Conference.  It was the first appearance in the Belk Bowl for both teams.

Teams

Arkansas

Prior to kickoff, Arkansas announced that senior tight end, Jeremy Sprinkle would be suspended for the bowl game. Sprinkle had been arrested for shoplifting  earlier in the week. On Tuesday, all players from both teams received a $450 gift card to purchase merchandise from a Belk store within a 90 minute timeframe. Sprinkle allegedly took more than he was allowed and was suspended by the Arkansas athletic department.

Virginia Tech
With its 2016 Belk Bowl appearance, the Virginia Tech football team extended its bowl streak to 24 consecutive games. The streak is the longest active bowl streak recognized by the NCAA.

Game summary

Scoring summary

Statistics

References

2016–17 NCAA football bowl games
2016
2016 Belk Bowl
2016 Belk Bowl
2016 in sports in North Carolina
December 2016 sports events in the United States